Mercury Man (Thai: มนุษย์เหล็กไหล or ) is a 2006 Thai superhero martial arts action film. It is directed by Bhandit Thongdee with martial arts choreography by Panna Rittikrai of Ong-Bak, Tom-Yum-Goong and Born to Fight.

Plot

After being stabbed with an ancient Tibetan amulet and having escaped to hospital, a Bangkok firefighter named Chan is transformed into a superhero when his body becomes a massive heat source, which he learns to manipulate to give him super strength, increased agility and the ability to make great leaps.

Chan's fate is entwined with an Afghan terrorist, Osama bin Ali, who wants the power of the Tibetan amulet to use in a plot to destroy the United States. With his international terrorist organization, led by henchwoman Areena, Osama kidnaps Chan's mother and sister (played by famed transgender Thai kickboxer Parinya Kiatbusaba) and takes them to the Royal Thai Navy base, where he hopes to launch a rocket at a US Navy chemical weapon ship. Osama also has suicide bombers spread out throughout Thailand, stationed in American franchises in Thailand, ready to act on his word.

Aided by the young female guardian of the amulet, Chan rescues his mother and sister. However, he must face Areena, who has stabbed herself with a companion amulet, giving her the powers of extreme cold and ice.

Production
Similar to Ong-Bak, which was also choreographed by Panna Rittikrai and produced by Prachya Pinkaew, Mercury Man contains "shout outs" to Western films. References to Spider-Man are seen throughout Mercury Man, in dialogue, in Spider-Man T-shirts worn by extras and through spray-painted messages in the scenery, such as "Spidy how R U?"

Soundtrack
Arnon Saisangchan (Osama bin Ali), is the lead singer of the Thai rock band Blackhead. Known as Phu Blackhead, he sings the song heard over the closing credits.

References

External links
 MercuryMan.com  domain, Trademark, and Comics owned by: Tommy G Warren, assoc. with Spiderwood Productions at www.SpiderwoodStudios.com  also SEE: www.MercuryMan.com 
 Mercury Man at the Thai Film Database
 Mercury Man Official Trailer (WMV Format)
 

 Not to be confused with the Adventure hero Mercury Man Comics

2006 films
Sahamongkol Film International films
2000s superhero films
2006 science fiction action films
Thai-language films
Muay Thai films
Thai Muay Thai films
2006 martial arts films
Transgender-related films
Thai science fiction action films
Thai martial arts films
Thai LGBT-related films
2006 LGBT-related films
Thai superhero films